Hugo Ekitike (born 20 June 2002) is a French professional footballer who plays as a striker for Ligue 1 club Paris Saint-Germain, on loan from Reims.

Early life
Hugo Ekitike was born on 20 June 2002 in Reims, Marne.

Club career

Reims
On 12 July 2020, Ekitike signed his first professional contract with Reims. He debuted with the senior team in a 3–1 Ligue 1 loss to Lorient on 17 October 2020. On 29 January 2021, Ekitike joined Danish Superliga club Vejle Boldklub on loan for the rest of the season.

On 26 September 2021, Ekitike scored Reims' second and third goals in a 3–1 win against Nantes, having come on as a substitute. In the January 2022 transfer window, Ekitike rejected a potential transfer to Newcastle United. Reims president Jean-Pierre Caillot admitted that the club had received "very good offers" for Ekitike, but reiterated that "there is still a piece of history to write together".

Paris Saint-Germain
On 16 July 2022, Paris Saint-Germain (PSG) announced the signing of Ekitike on a season-long loan with an option-to-buy for a reported fee of €35 million, bonuses included. According to several sources, the purchase option in the deal is mandatory.

Ekitike made his PSG debut as a substitute in a 5–0 league win away to Clermont on 6 August 2022. On 1 October, he made his first start for the club in a 2–1 league victory over Nice at the Parc des Princes. Ten days later, Ekitike made his UEFA Champions League debut, coming on as a late-match substitute in a 1–1 home draw against Benfica. On 13 November, he scored his first goal for Paris Saint-Germain in a 5–0 home win over Auxerre.

International career
Ekitike was born in France to a Cameroonian father and French mother. He is a youth international for France, having represented the France U20s.

Career statistics

References

External links
Profile at the Paris Saint-Germain F.C. website

2002 births
Living people
Sportspeople from Reims
Footballers from Grand Est
French footballers
Association football forwards
Stade de Reims players
Vejle Boldklub players
Paris Saint-Germain F.C. players
Championnat National 2 players
Ligue 1 players
Danish Superliga players
France youth international footballers
French expatriate footballers
Expatriate men's footballers in Denmark
French expatriate sportspeople in Denmark
Black French sportspeople
French sportspeople of Cameroonian descent